Ulrike Sennewald (born 10 May 1989) is a German rower who had her best achievements in the eights. In this event she won two medals at the European championships of 2010 and 2013 and finished in seventh place at the 2012 Summer Olympics.

Her father Hans competed in the same rowing event at the 1992 Olympics.

References

1989 births
Living people
German female rowers
Olympic rowers of Germany
Rowers at the 2012 Summer Olympics
Rowers from Rostock
European Rowing Championships medalists